Rouse is an English-language surname. Notable people with this surname include the following:

 Alan Rouse, British climber
 Alfred Rouse, British convicted murderer
 Andy Rouse, English racing driver
 Bob Rouse, Canadian ice hockey player
 Cecilia Rouse, American economist
 Cole Rouse, American professional racing driver
 Charlie Rouse, American jazz saxophonist 
 Christopher Rouse (composer), American composer
 Christopher Rouse (film editor), Academy Award-winning film editor
 Curtis Rouse, American football player
 E. Clive Rouse (1901–1997), English archaeologist
 Fred Rouse (footballer), English association football player
 Fred Rouse, American football player
Fred Rouse, lynching victim
 Hunter Rouse, hydraulician 
 Irving Rouse, American academic
 James W. Rouse, American activist and philanthropist
 Jeff Rouse, American swimmer
 Josh Rouse, American singer-songwriter
 Mikel Rouse, American composer
 Owen Thomas Rouse (1843–1919), American jurist
 Pete Rouse, American political advisor
 Prince E. Rouse, physicist of Rouse theory fame
 Richard Rouse III, American game designer and author
 Rob Rouse, English comedian and actor
 Robbie Rouse, American football player
 Russell Rouse, Academy Award-winning American screenwriter
 Simon Rouse, English actor
 W. H. D. Rouse, English classical scholar and teacher
 W. W. Rouse Ball, English mathematician
 Willard Rouse, American real estate developer
 Aaron Rouse, American football player and politician

See also
 Rowse

English-language surnames